Daring Danger is a 1932 American pre-Code Western directed by D. Ross Lederman.

Plot
Tim Madigan (Tim McCoy), a cowboy coming to the aid of Gerry Norris (Alberta Vaughn), whose father (Murdock MacQuarrie) is in trouble with a gang of cattle rustlers. The leaders of the rustlers, Hugo Distang (Robert Ellis) and Bull Bagley (Richard Alexander), prove to be the very same villains Madigan was trailing.

Cast
 Tim McCoy as Tim Madigan
 Alberta Vaughn as 'Gerry' Norris
 Wallace MacDonald as Jughandle
 Robert Ellis as Hugo DuSang
 Richard Alexander as Bull Bagley
 Murdock MacQuarrie as 'Pa' Norris
 Vernon Dent as Bartender Pee Wee
 Edward LeSaint as First Ranch Owner

References

External links
 
 
 
 

1932 films
1932 Western (genre) films
American Western (genre) films
1930s English-language films
American black-and-white films
Films directed by D. Ross Lederman
Columbia Pictures films
1930s American films